MTV India is an Indian pay television channel specialising in music, reality and youth culture programming. It was launched in 1996 as the Indian version of MTV and is owned by Viacom 18, a joint venture operation between MTV International owner Paramount Global and Reliance Industries' TV18. Most of the programming on the channel is produced in Hindi. MTV India has its headquarters in Vile Parle in Mumbai.

Related channels 
In 2014, Viacom 18 launched Pepsi MTV Indies, an indie music and subculture channel in partnership with Pepsi Co.

In 2016, MTV Indies was replaced by MTV Beats, a 24-hour music-only channel. After its launch, MTV India changed its focus on broadcasting reality series.

VH1 India airs the international productions of MTV instead of airing them on MTV India, along with international music.

Programming

VJs

Current
 Anusha Dandekar
 Benafsha Soonwalla
 Baseer Ali
 Gaelyn Mendonca
 Nikhil Chinapa
 Rannvijay Singh

Former
Amrita Arora
 Ayushmann Khurrana
 Bani J
 Cyrus Broacha
 Cyrus Sahukar
 Deepti Gujral
José Covaco
Malaika Arora
Maria Goretti
Mia Uyeda
Mini Mathur
Nafisa Joseph
Raageshwari Loomba
 Rhea Chakraborty
 Shenaz Treasury
 Siddharth Bhardwaj
 Soniya Mehra
 Sophie Choudry
 Sunanda Wong

Awards

 Fully Faltoo Film Awards
 Lycra MTV Style Awards
 MTV Immies
 MTV VMAI
 MTV Youth Icon of the Year

MTV Fully Faltoo Films
A series of spoof films under the banner of MTV Fully Faltoo Films were produced by MTV. The first film Ghoom, a spoof of 2004 film Dhoom was released theatrically on 2 June 2006. Three more spoof films "Jadoo Ek Bar" (Jodhaa Akbar), "Bechaare Zameen Par" (Taare Zameen Par) and "Cheque De India" (Chak De! India) aired on MTV under "Fully Faltoo Film Festival" from 20 September 2008 to 4 October 2008.

References

External links
 

Television stations in Mumbai
MTV channels
MTV_Beats
Television channels and stations established in 1996
Viacom 18
1996 establishments in Maharashtra